Wilhelm Friedrich Rinck (1793–1854) was a German Protestant priest (from 1814), biblical scholar and palaeographer. Rinck collated manuscripts housed at the Marcian Library – Minuscule 205, 205abs (now recognized as 2886), 209, 460, 1923, 1924, 1925, Lectionary 34.

Works 
 Das Sendscreiben der Korinther an den Apostle Paulus und das dritte sendscreiben Pauli an die Korinther (Heidelberg 1823)
 Lucubratio critica in Acta Apostolorum, Epistolas catholicas et Paulinas, Sumtu Fel. Schneideri: Basilae 1830.
 Apokalyptische Forschungen, oder: Grundriss der Offenbarung Johannis und Anleitung zu ihrem Vesrtändniss (Zürich 1853)
 Die Religion der Hellenen: Aus den Mythen, den Lehren der Philosophen und dem Kultus (Zürich 1853) Volume 1
 Die Religion der Hellenen (1853)
 Jahrbücher für classische Philologie. Teubner, Leipzig 1860

References

External links 
 

1793 births
1854 deaths
German biblical scholars